Liu Guichun (1933 – October 10, 2007) was a Chinese police officer known for his appeal to the international media to concern his son Liu Gang's persecution in jail. He served as a section chief cadre in Public Security Bureau in Liaoyuan.

After his second child, Liu Gang, sentenced to six-year jail term for leading the Tiananmen Square protests of 1989, Liu Guichun was protested that his son was being tortured seriously and the Chinese government reportedly forbidden his family from visiting illegally in Lingyuan Labor-Reform Camp. Through gave interviews to foreign reporters and wrote open letters to the international human rights organizations, Liu Guichun and his family called upon the international to concern the human right condition in China. Persecuted by the communist party, Liu was suspended from important position being police, later he declared his withdrawal from the Communist Party of China.

Married with Huang Guiqin, Liu had four children, including Liu Gang, Liu Ming, and Liu Yong.

References

1933 births
2007 deaths
People from Liaoyuan